Alice Pruvot-Fol (4 August 1873 – 28 March 1972) was a French opisthobranch malacologist.

She was the author of many new species, mostly described on the basis of  preserved animals. She described a new species (Nembrotha rutilans, Pruvot-Fol, 1931) on the basis of a painted illustration in a book by William Saville-Kent (1893) entitled The Great Barrier Reef of Australia. She continued working and naming new species until late in her life. Even in 1962, when she was 89 years old, she named Phyllidia pulitzeri.

Species
Some of the species described by her: 
Aldisa banyulensis Pruvot-Fol, 1951
Aplysiopsis formosa Pruvot-Fol
Atagema gibba Pruvot-Fol
Atagema rugosa Pruvot-Fol, 1951
Chelidonura africana Pruvot-Fol
Chromodoris kuniei Pruvot-Fol, 1930
Cumanotus cuenoti Pruvot-Fol, 1948
Doriopsilla rarispinosa Pruvot-Fol, 1951
Elysia babai Pruvot-Fol, 1945
Elysia mercieri Pruvot-Fol, 1930
Facelina dubia Pruvot-Fol, 1949
Glossodoris hikuerensis (Pruvot-Fol, 1954)
Goniodoridella savignyi Pruvot-Fol, 1933
Hermaea paucicirra Pruvot-Fol, 1953
Hypselodoris dollfusi (Pruvot-Fol, 1933
Hypselodoris fontandraui Pruvot-Fol, 1951.
Laginiopsis trilobata Pruvot-Fol, 1922
Marianina rosea (Pruvot-Fol, 1930)
Nembrotha rutilans (Pruvot-Fol, 1931) is a synonym for Nembrotha purpureolineata O'Donoghue, 1924
Phyllidia bataviae Pruvot-Fol, 1957
Phyllidia pulitzeri Pruvot-Fol, 1962
Phyllidiopsis krempfi Pruvot-Fol, 1957
Trapania Pruvot-Fol, 1931
Thecacera darwini, Pruvot-Fol, 1950
Thordisa filix Pruvot-Fol, 1951

Named in her honor
Several genera and species were named in her honor: 
Aegires pruvotfolae Fahey & Gosliner, 2004
Elysia pruvotfolae Ernst Marcus, 1957
Hallaxa apefae Marcus & Marcus, (using just the initials APF)
Pruvotaplysia Engel, 1936
Pruvotfolia Tardy, 1970
Pruvotfolia pselliotes
Pruvotfolia longicirrha n.comb.

Selected works

Pruvot, A., 1922. Sur un type nouveau et remarquable de gymnosomes (Laginiopsis n.g.). -- Compt. Rend. hebdom. Séanc. Acad. Sci, 174: 696-698. 
Pruvot-Fol, A., 1924. Étude de quelques gymnosomes méditerranéens des pêches de l'Orvet en 1921 et 1922. -- Arch. Zool. Exp. Gén., 62(6): 345-400, 32 figs, pls 15-16. 
Pruvot-Fol, A., 1925. Contributions à l'étude du genre Janthina Bolten. -- C.R. hebd. Séances Acad. Sci., 181: .... 
Pruvot-Fol, A., 1926. Mollusques ptéropodes gymnosomes provenant des campagnes du *Prince Albert 1 de Monaco. -- Résultats des Campagnes Scientifiques accomplies sur son yacht par Albert I, Prince souverain de Monaco, publiés sous sa direction avec le concours de M. Jules Richard, Docteur ès-sciences, chargé des travaux zoologiques à bord, 70: 1-60, 3 tabs, 102 figs. 
Pruvot-Fol, A., 1930. Sur l'identité réelle et la valeur systématique de Micrella dubia Bgh.. -- Bull. Soc. zool. France, 55: 210-213. 
Pruvot-Fol, A., 1932. Note sur quelques gymnosomes de provenances diverses et diagnose d'un genre nouveau. -- Arch. Zool. expér. gén., 74 (vol. jub.): 507-529, 18 figs, pl. 3. 
Pruvot-Fol, A., 1934. Les opisthobranches de Quoy & Gaimard. Appendum 2. Les gymnosomes de Quoy & Gaimard. -- Arch. Mus. Nat. Hist. nat., (6)11: 81. 
Pruvot-Fol, A., 1934. Note malacologique. A propos du tubercule médian du pied des gymnosomes. -- Bull. Soc. zool. France, 59(4): 291-293. 
Pruvot-Fol, A., 1934. Faune et flore de la Méditerranée. Gastropoda-Opisthobranchia-Gymnosomata. -- Comm. Intern. Expl. Sc. Mer Méditerr., ..... 
Pruvot-Fol, A., 1936. Morphologie du pied des mollusques. Ses homologies. -- Verh. schweiz. Naturf. Gesellsch., 117: 327-328. 
Pruvot-Fol, A., 1938. Sur les apparences trompeuses de quelques échantillons de gymnosomes à l'état conservé. -- Journal de Conchyliologie, 82(3): 256-258, figs A-B, pl. 4. 
Pruvot-Fol, A., 1942. Les gymnosomes. -- Dana Rep., 4(20): 1-54, 77 figs.
Pruvot-Fol A. (1951). "Étude des nudibranches de la Méditerranée". Archives de zoologie expérimentale et générale 88(1): 73.
Pruvot-Fol A. (1954). "Mollusques Opisthobranches". Faune de France, P. Lechevalier Paris 58: 1-460.
Pruvot-Fol, A., 1954. Mollusques opisthobranches. Paris, Lechevalier: 1-457, 173 figs, 1 pl. 
Pruvot-Fol, A., 1960. Les organes génitaux des opisthobranches. -- Arch. Zool. expér. gén., 99(2): 135-223, 33 figs. 
Pruvot-Fol, A., 1963. Les ventouses chez les mollusques gastéropodes et plus spécialement chez les gymnosomes. -- Journal de Conchyliologie, 103(1): 3-20, 11 figs.

References

 (in French)
 (in French)

French zoologists
French malacologists
1873 births
1972 deaths